Goldstream Dredge No. 8 is a ladder dredge operated by the Fairbanks Exploration Company from 1928 to 1959. It is located on the old Steese Highway between Fairbanks and Fox in the central part of Alaska.

Starting in the 1920s, water was brought to the area through the  Davidson Ditch for gold mining. The Goldstream Dredge No. 8 cut a  track and produced 7.5 million ounces of gold.

The dredge was named a Historic Mechanical Engineering Landmark by the American Society of Mechanical Engineers in 1986.  In 1984, it was listed as a historic district on the National Register of Historic Places.

Today, it is open to the public. During summer months, tours of the dredge and gold panning are available for a small fee.

See also
 National Register of Historic Places listings in Fairbanks North Star Borough, Alaska
 Chatanika gold dredge (Fairbanks)
 Coal Creek Historic Mining District
 F. E. Company Dredge No. 4

References

Buildings and structures completed in 1927
1928 establishments in Alaska
Gold mining in Alaska
Historic districts on the National Register of Historic Places in Alaska
Industrial buildings and structures on the National Register of Historic Places in Alaska
Industrial equipment on the National Register of Historic Places
Gold dredges
Mining museums in Alaska
Museums in Fairbanks North Star Borough, Alaska
National Register of Historic Places in Fairbanks North Star Borough, Alaska
Roadside attractions in Alaska